James Hill (December 6, 1822 – August 2, 1909) was a soldier in the United States Army during the American Civil War. He received the Medal of Honor.

Biography
Hill was born on December 6, 1822 in England.

On May 16, 1863, at Champion Hills, Miss., on May 16, 1863, as a First Lieutenant, Company I, 21st Iowa Infantry. He was "Rev. Hill" before the war, but gave up his church to enlist as a Private. He was later promoted to Lieutenant, and was acting as his unit's quartermaster in command of a party of foragers during the action for which he was awarded his medal. He was later reassigned as Chaplain for the regiment, the title shown on his Medal of Honor plaque.

Hill died on September 22, 1899, and was buried in Cascade Community Cemetery, in Cascade, Iowa.

Medal of Honor citation
Rank and organization: First Lieutenant, CompanyI, 21st Iowa Volunteer Infantry. Place and date: At  Champion Hills, Miss., on May 16, 1863.

Citation:

By skillful and brave management captured 3 of the enemy's pickets.

See also
 List of Medal of Honor recipients
 List of American Civil War Medal of Honor recipients: G–L

Notes

References

External links
 FamilySearch: 21st Regiment, Iowa Infantry
 

1822 births
1899 deaths
United States Army Medal of Honor recipients
People of Iowa in the American Civil War
American Civil War recipients of the Medal of Honor